Wilhelm Holzbauer (3 September 1930 – 15 June 2019) was an Austrian architect, noted as a "pragmatic" modernist. He was a student of Clemens Holzmeister at the Vienna University of Technology between 1950 and 1953. In 1956–57, he studied at the Massachusetts Institute of Technology as a Fulbright Scholar. From 1977 to 1998, he was professor at the University of Applied Arts Vienna.

Projects

References

Further reading
Liesbeth Waechter-Bohm: Wilhelm Holzbauer: 50 Years of Architecture, Springer Verlag, 2006

External links

Holzbauer and Partners

Austrian architects
1930 births
2019 deaths